McCanlis is a surname. Notable people with the surname include:

George McCanlis (1847–1937), English cricketer
Maurice McCanlis (1906–1991), English cricketer
William McCanlis (1840–1925), English cricketer